All Sail Set: A Romance of the Flying Cloud is a children's novel written and illustrated by Armstrong Sperry. It was first published in 1935 and was a Newbery Honor recipient in 1936.

Plot 
The novel tells the story of Enoch Thatcher, a boy who sails on the maiden voyage of the legendary Flying Cloud, when the clipper set the record for sailing from New York to San Francisco around Cape Horn. It is notable for its accurate depiction of sailing ships, complemented by the detailed drawings.

Reception
All Sail Set was a Newbery Honor recipient in 1936. 

The Fort Worth Star Telegram called it "a magical book" with an "irresistible" romance.

References

1935 American novels
American children's novels
Children's historical novels
Newbery Honor-winning works
Novels set in the 19th century
1935 children's books